Craig Township may refer to one of the following places within the United States:

 Craig Township, Switzerland County, Indiana
 Craig Township, Burt County, Nebraska

Township name disambiguation pages